Old Town Hall Historic District may refer to:

 Old Town Hall Commercial Historic District, Wilmington, Delaware
 Old Town Hall Historic District (Salem, Massachusetts), now part of the Downtown Salem District
 Old Town Hall Historic District (Huntington, New York)

See also
Old Town Historic District (disambiguation)